Elm Creek is an  tributary of the Blue Earth River in southern Minnesota. It rises in northeastern Jackson County and flows eastwardly through Martin County into northeastern Faribault County, where it joins the Blue Earth River near the city of Winnebago. Via the Blue Earth and Minnesota rivers, it is part of the Mississippi River watershed.

Elm Creek was named for the elm trees along its banks.

See also
List of rivers of Minnesota

References

Minnesota Watersheds
USGS Hydrologic Unit Map - State of Minnesota (1974)

Rivers of Minnesota
Rivers of Jackson County, Minnesota
Rivers of Martin County, Minnesota
Rivers of Faribault County, Minnesota
Tributaries of the Mississippi River